Potočari may refer to the following places in Bosnia and Herzegovina:

 Potočari, Srebrenica, a local community consisting of the two villages:
 Donji Potočari
 Gornji Potočari
 Potočari, Brčko, a village in the Brčko District

See also
Potočani (disambiguation)